Margaret de Monthermer (14 October 1329 – 24 March 1394/1395) was an English heiress and suo jure Baroness Monthermer.

Life
In 1297 her grandfather Ralph de Monthermer had married Joan of Acre, to the displeasure of her father King Edward I. He had three children with Joan, and after her death, he was appointed Baron Monthermer. One of his sons was Thomas de Monthermer, Margaret's father.

Margaret was born on 14 October 1329. Thomas de Monthermer died in 1340 whilst fighting in the Battle of Sluys. Upon the death of her father, Margaret became suo jure Baroness Monthermer at the age of 10. She was also the heiress of Stokenham.

In 1343 Margaret married John de Montacute (later 1st Baron Montacute), a younger son of William Montagu, 1st Earl of Salisbury. She died on 24 March 1394 or 1395.

References 

Works cited

1329 births
1390s deaths
Hereditary women peers
14th-century English women
14th-century English landowners
14th-century women landowners
English baronesses
Barons Monthermer